A Bankrupt Honeymoon is a 1926 American silent comedy film featuring Oliver Hardy.

Cast
 Harold Goodwin as Harold Pembroke
 Shirley Palmer as Shirley Lee
 Oliver Hardy as A taxi driver (as Babe Hardy)
 Frank Beal as A drunk
 Harry Dunkinson
 Sidney Bracey as Butler

See also
 List of American films of 1926
 Oliver Hardy filmography

References

External links

1926 films
1926 short films
American silent short films
Silent American comedy films
American black-and-white films
Films directed by Lewis Seiler
American comedy short films
1926 comedy films
1920s American films